Omloop Mandel-Leie-Schelde is a cycling race held annually in Belgium. It is part of UCI Europe Tour in category 1.1.

Winners

References

Cycle races in Belgium
UCI Europe Tour races
Recurring sporting events established in 1945
1945 establishments in Belgium